The West African Postal Conference, or Conference des Posts de L'Afrique de L'Ouest, was formed in 2001 as a forum for postal services in West African countries.

The members are:
Benin
Burkina Faso
Ghana
Côte d'Ivoire
Mali
Niger
Nigeria
Senegal
Togo

References

External links 
  (in French)

Postal organizations
International organizations based in Africa
Organizations established in 2001
2001 establishments in Africa